Ulysses Football Club was a football club based in New Malden, England.

History
Founded as a football club for graduates from the University of London, Ulysses first competed in senior football in the 1962–63 season, finishing eighth in the London League. In 1971, Ulysses joined the newly founded Metropolitan–London League, performing poorly in the league for a three-season spell. In 1975, a season after their first participation in the FA Vase, Ulysses joined the London Spartan League. At the end of the 1990–91 Spartan League season, Ulysses left senior football. Following their time in senior football, Ulysses competed in the Amateur Football Alliance and the Amateur Football Combination.

Ground
Ulysses played at the University of London Athletics Stadium in Motspur Park. Fulham later purchased the facilities in 1999, converting the site into their training ground.

Records
Best FA Vase performance: Second round, 1974–75

References

External links

Defunct football clubs in England
University of London
University and college football clubs in England
London League (football)
Metropolitan–London League
Spartan League
Amateur Football Combination
Sport in the Royal Borough of Kingston upon Thames
Defunct football clubs in London
Amateur association football teams